The Moerdijk bridges in the Netherlands are bridges that connect the Island of Dordrecht with the Dutch province of North Brabant (Noord-Brabant) across the Hollands Diep. The first bridge was built at the end of the 19th century, and was a railway bridge. The second bridge was built in the 1930s for road traffic, and is currently part of the A16 motorway. This bridge was replaced in 1978 by a more modern, wider bridge. A second railroad bridge was finished in 2006, as part of the HSL-Zuid project.

At the beginning of the Battle of Holland, on 10 May 1940, bridges were captured during a paratroopers operation and held for 4 days until German forward forces arrived. In 1944, both the road and railway bridge were destroyed by the Germans to prevent the Allied Forces from reaching the province South Holland.

Bridges over the Meuse
Bridges over the Rhine
Railway bridges in the Netherlands
Road bridges in the Netherlands
Steel bridges in the Netherlands
Bridges in North Brabant
Bridges in South Holland
Buildings and structures in Dordrecht
Transport in Dordrecht
Transport in Moerdijk